SMS S90 was a torpedo-boat of the Imperial German Navy. She was built by Schichau at Elbing as the lead ship of her class, completing in 1899.

At the start of the First World War, S90 was based at the German colony at Tsingtao, China.

Design and construction
From the mid 1880s, the Imperial German Navy built up a large force of torpedo boats, while building a few larger "Division Boats" to lead the torpedo boat flotillas. These ships, known as Große Torpedoboote or Hochsee Torpedoboote (large torpedo boats or high-seas torpedo boats) were large enough to carry the extra crew needed to act as flotilla leaders, eliminating the need to build separate Division boats, but, although they were of similar size to contemporary foreign torpedo-boat destroyers, they were still principally intended for torpedo attack, and only carried a light gun armament.

An initial group of 12 of the new large torpedo boats (S90–S101) were built by the Schichau-Werke shipyard at Elbing in East Prussia, Germany's principal builder of torpedo boats from 1898 to 1901, and this was followed by successive orders for similar ships, of gradually evolving design until 1907.

S90, the lead ship of the class, was laid down in 1898 as yard number 644, was launched on 26 July 1899 and completed on 24 October 1899.

While most contemporary torpedo boats and destroyers had turtleback forecastles, the S90-class instead had a short raised forecastle, giving improved seakeeping.

She reached a speed of  during sea trials in November 1899, fully equipped and carrying 65 tons of coal.

Armament consisted of three  SK L/40 guns, with two mounted side-by-side forward and one aft. Three single 45 cm torpedo tubes were fitted, with one in the gap between the ship's forecastle and the bridge, and two aft. Two spare torpedoes could be carried. The ship had a crew of 50 officers and other ranks.

Service
At the outbreak of the First World War, S90 was one of two torpedo boats attached to the German East Asiatic Squadron, with the main base at Tsingtao in China. The elderly S90, however, was only suitable for local patrols, while the ex-Chinese destroyer  was no longer operational. On 22 August 1914, the British destroyer , part of a British squadron patrolling off Tsingtao, spotted S90 and tried to stop the German torpedo boat from returning to port. Kennet fired 136 rounds and one torpedo at S90, but S90 was undamaged and reached Tsingtao safely, while S90s return fire damaged Kennet, disabling one of Kennets guns and killing five of the British ships crew.

Japan declared war on Germany on 23 August 1914, and soon began operations to besiege Tsingtao. On 17 October 1914, S90 sortied from Tsingtao and torpedoed  the  before scuttling herself by intentionally running herself aground. Her crew were interned by neutral China in Nanking. They attempted escape on 30 October 1914, but were recaptured.

Notes

References

Torpedo boats of the Imperial German Navy
World War I torpedo boats of Germany
1899 ships
Maritime incidents in October 1914
Scuttled vessels of Germany
World War I shipwrecks in the Pacific Ocean